Lio (also spelled Li'o) is an Austronesian language spoken in the central part of Flores, one of the Lesser Sunda Islands in the eastern half of Indonesia. It belongs to the Central Flores subgroup.

Phonology

References

Further reading
 

Sumba languages
Languages of Indonesia